UFC 258: Usman vs. Burns was a mixed martial arts event produced by the Ultimate Fighting Championship that took place on February 13, 2021, at the UFC Apex facility in Enterprise, Nevada, part of the Las Vegas Metropolitan Area, United States.

Background 
A UFC Welterweight Championship bout between the current champion Kamaru Usman (also The Ultimate Fighter: American Top Team vs. Blackzilians welterweight winner) and Gilbert Burns served as the event headliner. The duo was previously scheduled to meet in July 2020 at UFC 251. However, it was announced on July 3 that Burns was pulled from the contest after he and his coach, Greg Jones, tested positive for COVID-19. They were also briefly targeted to headline UFC 256, but Usman pulled out citing more time needed to recover from undisclosed injuries.

A middleweight bout between former interim UFC Middleweight Championship challenger Kelvin Gastelum (also The Ultimate Fighter: Team Jones vs. Team Sonnen middleweight winner) and Ian Heinisch was originally expected to take place at a planned event on January 30. However, the UFC opted against holding a Fight Night on that date and rescheduled the contest to this card.

A middleweight bout between five-time Brazilian jiu-jitsu World Champion Rodolfo Vieira and Anthony Hernandez was expected to take place at UFC Fight Night: Holloway vs. Kattar. However, Hernandez pulled out due to a positive COVID-19 test and they were rescheduled for this event.

A bantamweight rematch featuring Pedro Munhoz and Jimmie Rivera was also expected to take place at the planned January 30 date. They previously met at UFC Fight Night: Belfort vs. Henderson 3 in November 2015, when Rivera won via split decision. The pairing was then rescheduled for UFC on ESPN: Chiesa vs. Magny, before being moved once again, as they were booked to this event due to undisclosed reasons. During the week leading up to the event, the bout was delayed again due to a positive COVID-19 test for someone within the two camps. The pairing remained intact and was rescheduled for two weeks later at UFC Fight Night: Rozenstruik vs. Gane.

A welterweight bout between Dhiego Lima and Belal Muhammad was originally expected to take place in December 2020 at UFC Fight Night: Thompson vs. Neal. However, Muhammad was diagnosed with COVID-19 during the week leading up to the event and the bout was scrapped. The pairing was left intact and took place at this event.

A featherweight bout between Brian Kelleher and Ricky Simón took place at the event. The pairing has been scheduled and cancelled twice before. First, in September 2020 at UFC Fight Night: Overeem vs. Sakai, but Simón's cornerman tested positive for COVID-19 and he was forced to withdraw from the event. The pairing was then rescheduled for UFC on ABC: Holloway vs. Kattar, but this time Kelleher tested positive and was pulled from the bout.

A middleweight rematch between former UFC Middleweight Champion Chris Weidman and Uriah Hall was scheduled to take place at this event. They met previously in September 2010 at a Ring of Combat event for the organization's middleweight title, with Weidman winning via TKO. However, Weidman was pulled from the event in late-January due to a positive COVID-19 test. The pairing remained intact and was rescheduled for UFC 261.

A lightweight bout between Bobby Green and Jim Miller was scheduled for this event. The pairing was previously arranged for UFC 172 in April 2014, but Green pulled out of that bout citing an elbow injury. They were once again cancelled as Green collapsed after the weigh-ins and was deemed unfit to compete.

A women's flyweight bout between Gillian Robertson and Miranda Maverick was scheduled for this event, but it was cancelled on the day of the event after Robertson had a non-COVID related illness.

Results

Bonus awards
The following fighters received $50,000 bonuses.
Fight of the Night: No bonus awarded.
Performance of the Night: Kamaru Usman, Julian Marquez, Anthony Hernandez and Polyana Viana

See also 

 List of UFC events
 List of current UFC fighters
 2021 in UFC

References 

Ultimate Fighting Championship events
2021 in mixed martial arts
February 2021 sports events in the United States
2021 in sports in Nevada
Mixed martial arts in Las Vegas
Sports competitions in Las Vegas